Mitchell Robinson III (born April 1, 1998) is an American professional basketball player for the New York Knicks of the National Basketball Association (NBA).  He was selected with the 36th overall pick in the 2018 NBA draft. Before beginning his professional career, he gained national coverage for withdrawing from his commitment to attend Western Kentucky University to instead dedicate the entire 2017–18 season for training on his own, being the first player to make such a decision.

High school career

Mitchell Robinson attended Pine Forest High School in Pensacola, Florida for the first two years of his high school career, briefly transferring to Landry-Walker College and Career Preparatory High School in New Orleans as a sophomore, for whom he never played. He first appeared in the summer league before his junior year for Chalmette High School.

As a junior, Robinson led the Owls to their first state playoff win in 19 years, and in the second round, helped give the first seed and eventual state champion Natchitoches Central High School all they could handle before bowing out, their closest playoff game until the state final. He averaged 20.9 points, 13.6 rebounds, 8.1 blocks, and 2 steals per game. He made the all-district, all-Metro, and all-State teams for his efforts. Robinson then joined Dallas-based Nike Pro Skills on the AAU circuit for the summer, winning individual honors in the Nike EYBL and leading Pro Skills to the season-ending Peach Jam. His recruiting ranking shot up, and he earned his fifth star. Against the top players in the country, Robinson averaged 15.5 points, 11.6 rebounds, and 4.1 blocks per game, being named to the All-EYBL second team.

As a senior at Chalmette, Robinson averaged 25.7 points, 12.6 rebounds, and 6 blocked shots per outing, while earning Naismith Trophy All-America honorable mention and MaxPreps All-America honorable mention status as well as USA Today All-USA Louisiana first team honors and being named All-District, All-Metro, All-State, and the All-Metro Player of the Year from the New Orleans Advocate, as well as the St. Bernard Post Male Athlete of the Year for the parish. He led Chalmette to their first district championship in their own regular season tournament in 20 years, first district title in 21 years in the toughest basketball district in the state, and to the state semifinals for the first time in 32 years. In the Owls' 4 game state playoff run, Robinson averaged 34.5 points, 13.5 rebounds, and 7.8 blocks. Robinson became the first Chalmette basketball player to be named a McDonald's All-American, and also played in the Jordan Brand Classic and the LHSBCA All-Star game.

Playing in the 2017 McDonald's All-American Boys Game, Robinson tallied 14 points, three rebounds and two blocked shots. He participated in the 2017 Jordan Brand Classic, scoring 15 points in 17 minutes of play, while pulling down three rebounds.

Robinson originally committed to play college basketball at Texas A&M, but then de-committed to follow coach Rick Stansbury to Western Kentucky. Stansbury had recruited Robinson as the Aggies' assistant coach. Basketball writer Jason Frakes wrote in February 2017, Robinson "may go down as the biggest recruiting coup in WKU basketball history."

College career
In July 2017, Robinson had enrolled at Western Kentucky University for the summer semester, and practiced with the team for about two weeks before a planned team trip to Costa Rica. Sources then indicated that he had left campus, and his room was cleaned out. He was then suspended indefinitely for violating the team rules. After speaking with head coach Rick Stansbury, he was granted a release to transfer, and barring an unexpected decision by the NCAA, would have had to sit out the 2017–18 season.

With the hope that a waiver would be granted by the NCAA, Robinson took visits to Louisiana State University, University of Kansas, and the University of New Orleans in August 2017. On August 27, Robinson returned to Western Kentucky a month after leaving campus.

On September 18, Robinson announced he would forgo college and prepare for the 2018 NBA draft on his own accord. He would be the first recruited draft pick to wind up not playing for any college, professional, or high school/postgraduate team throughout an entire year before entering an NBA draft, although he would still be credited as coming out of Western Kentucky by the NBA. Furthermore, because of his brief time going to summer classes in Western Kentucky, he was ultimately barred from participating in the NBA G League later in the season due to G League rules. The ruling also affected a few similar prospects who were stuck in difficult situations at the time as well, like Billy Preston and De'Anthony Melton. The announcement also influenced at least one person to train by themselves for a year before entering an NBA draft, as fellow five-star recruit Darius Bazley originally planned on not going to college at Syracuse University in order to try out for the NBA G League before deciding against that as well, claiming that it was the only league where winning does not matter after all.

Robinson was named one of 69 players who planned to participate in the NBA Draft Combine. However, on the day of the event, Robinson withdrew from all combine events.

Professional career

New York Knicks (2018–present)
On June 21, 2018, Robinson was selected with the 36th overall pick in the 2018 NBA draft by the New York Knicks. After appearing for the Knicks in the 2018 NBA Summer League, where he set summer league records for blocked shots and offensive rebounds, he signed a multi-year, rookie scale contract with the Knicks on July 8, 2018. After struggling with an ankle injury during the preseason, Robinson would make his professional debut on October 17, scoring two points in a 127–106 win against the Atlanta Hawks. Robinson made his first start on October 26, recording seven points and six rebounds in 29 minutes of action in a 128–100 loss to the Golden State Warriors. On November 2, Robinson recorded his first double-double with 13 points and 10 rebounds, alongside three assists and three steals, in a 118–106 win over the Dallas Mavericks. On November 11, Robinson set the Knicks' rookie record with nine blocks in a 115–89 loss to the Orlando Magic. On March 28, 2019, Robinson recorded season highs of 19 points and 21 rebounds in the Knicks' 117–92 loss to the Toronto Raptors, and became the first Knicks' rookie since Willis Reed in 1965 to record 19 points and 21 rebounds in a game. On April 9, he recorded eight points and 17 rebounds in a 96–86 win over the Chicago Bulls. Robinson finished the season second in the NBA in blocked shots per game, only behind Myles Turner of the Indiana Pacers, and was named to the All-Rookie Second Team.

On December 17, 2019, Robinson scored a career-high 22 points and recorded 13 rebounds in a 143–120 win against the Hawks. On January 1, 2020, Robinson scored 22 points on perfect 11-of-11 shooting from the field in a 117–93 win against the Portland Trail Blazers. On February 26, Robinson recorded a double-double with 12 points and a season-high 16 rebounds in a 108–101 loss to the Charlotte Hornets. When the 2019–20 regular season finished, Robinson broke Wilt Chamberlain's NBA record for highest field goal percentage in a single season.

On February 12, 2021, in the Knicks' game against the Washington Wizards, Robinson fractured his right hand during the second quarter and did not return after halftime.

On July 12, 2022, Robinson re-signed with the Knicks to a reported four-year contract.

National team career
Robinson was named to the preliminary roster of the United States national under-19 team in 2017, but did not make the final cut for the 12-men squad for the 2017 FIBA Under-19 Basketball World Cup.

At the tryout, Robinson measured  without shoes,  with shoes, with a  wingspan and  standing reach.

Player profile
Robinson has been called by some analysts "the best shot blocker in his class", with uncommon closing speed and a long reach that led to numerous highlight reel blocks. He uses that speed also to run the fast break exceptionally well for a big man of his size, being called the "most entertaining player" in the New Orleans area for his ability to convert alley-oop dunks. Robinson improved his free throw shooting over the course of his two years at Chalmette, and developed range from behind the three point line, making as many as 5 in a game. NBA draft projections have compared his game to DeAndre Jordan and Tyson Chandler.

Career statistics

NBA

|-
| style="text-align:left;"|
| style="text-align:left;"|New York
| 66 || 19 || 20.6 || .694 ||  || .600 || 6.4 || .6 || .8 || 2.4 || 7.3
|-
| style="text-align:left;"|
| style="text-align:left;"|New York
| 61 || 7 || 23.1 || style="background:#e0cef2;"|.742 ||  || .568 || 7.0 || .6 || .9 || 2.0 || 9.7
|-
| style="text-align:left;"|
| style="text-align:left;"|New York
| 31 || 29 || 27.5 || .653 ||  || .491 || 8.1 || .5 || 1.1 || 1.5 || 8.3
|-
| style="text-align:left;"|
| style="text-align:left;"|New York
| 72 || 62 || 25.7 || .761 ||  || .486 || 8.6 || .5 || .8 || 1.8 || 8.5
|- class="sortbottom"
| style="text-align:center;" colspan="2"|Career
| 230 || 117 || 23.8 || .722 ||  || .540 || 7.5 || .6 || .9 || 2.0 || 8.4

References

External links

 ESPN profile
 Scout.com profile
 MaxPreps profile

1998 births
Living people
African-American basketball players
American men's basketball players
Basketball players from Florida
Basketball players from Louisiana
Centers (basketball)
McDonald's High School All-Americans
New York Knicks draft picks
New York Knicks players
People from Chalmette, Louisiana
Sportspeople from Pensacola, Florida
21st-century African-American sportspeople